Dieter Herbst (born 31 July 1960 in Groß-Gerau, Hesse) is a German communication expert, with core expertise in Marketing Management and Public Relations. He holds a doctorate in Sociology and lectures at universities, such as University of St. Gallen or FOM - University of Applied Sciences. Herbst was 15 years the corporate communication officer of Schering AG and has published over 20 books nationally and internationally on subjects related to marketing and communications.

External links 
Listing in the German National Library Index 
Official Website

1960 births
Living people
People from Groß-Gerau
Marketing theorists
Public relations theorists
Schering people